Whitesloanea (also White-sloanea) is a monotypic genus of flowering plants belonging to the family Apocynaceae. It has only one known species; White-sloanea crassa (N.E.Br.) Chiov.

It has an unusual odour, in that many believe it to smell of faecal matter. Some have postulated that the centre of the flower is actually meant to mimic an anal cavity.

It is native to Somalia.

The genus was circumscribed by Emilio Chiovenda in Malpighia vol.34 on page 541 in 1937.

The genus name of White-sloanea is in honour of Alain Campbell White (1880–1951), who was an American botanist and succulent specialist and chess player and also Boyd Lincoln Sloane (1815–1878), who was an American botanist and specialist in Cactaceae.

References

Asclepiadoideae
Apocynaceae genera
Flora of Somalia